The Netherlands and its people have made contributions to the arts, science, technology and engineering, economics and finance, cartography and geography, exploration and navigation, law and jurisprudence, thought and philosophy, medicine. and agriculture. The following list is composed of objects, (largely) unknown lands, breakthrough ideas/concepts, principles, phenomena, processes, methods, techniques, styles that were discovered or invented by people from the Netherlands.

Lists 

 List of Dutch inventions and innovations
 List of Dutch discoveries
 List of Dutch explorations

See also 
 List of place names of Dutch origin
 Australian places with Dutch names
 Toponymy of New Netherland
 New Holland
 List of English words of Dutch origin
 Japanese words of Dutch origin

Notes

References

External links 
 Daily Dutch Innovation

Lists of inventions or discoveries
Inventions and discoveries
.
Science and technology in the Dutch Republic
Science and technology in the Netherlands
Dutch exploration in the Age of Discovery
Expeditions from the Netherlands
List of Dutch inventions